Marcos Britez Ojeda (born May 22, 1986 in Buenos Aires, Argentina) is an Argentina former professional footballer who played as a midfielder.

Teams
 Los Andes 2004–2006
 Tristán Suárez 2007
 Los Andes 2007–2009
 Racing Club 2009–2010
 Huracán 2010–2011
 Independiente Rivadavia 2011–2013
 Talleres de Córdoba 2013–2014
 Tristán Suárez 2014
 Los Andes 2015–2017
 Altos Hornos Zapla 2017–2018
 Almirante Brown 2018–2019
 Los Andes 2019
 Tristán Suárez 2019–2021
 Almirante Brown 2022

External links
 
 

Living people
1986 births
Argentine footballers
Association football midfielders
Club Atlético Huracán footballers
Club Atlético Los Andes footballers
Racing Club de Avellaneda footballers
CSyD Tristán Suárez footballers
Independiente Rivadavia footballers
Altos Hornos Zapla players
Club Almirante Brown footballers
Argentine Primera División players
Footballers from Buenos Aires